Renaming may refer to:

Place names
 Geographical renaming
 Lists of renamed places

Computing
 Batch renaming
 Great Renaming
 Register renaming
 Rename (computing)
 Rename_(relational_algebra)

See also
 Rename (disambiguation)